George William Forbes  (12 March 1869 – 17 May 1947) was a New Zealand politician who served as the 22nd prime minister of New Zealand from 28 May 1930 to 6 December 1935.

Forbes was born in Lyttelton and later began farming near Christchurch. He became active in local politics. Forbes first entered the House of Representatives in 1908 as a member of the Liberal Party, and when that party declined he became the leader of the newly created United Party in 1928. His rise to power as Prime Minister was unexpected, and some believed him unsuited to the post; it was his misfortune to hold office during the very worst period of the Great Depression. He nevertheless remained in power for five years. Forbes headed the United–Reform coalition Government that eventually became the modern National Party.

Often referred to as "Honest George", Forbes had a reputation for probity, rare debating skill, and impressive memory. His courteous and friendly attitude earned him the liking and respect of parliamentarians from all sides of the House.  Throughout his time in national politics his Hurunui constituents held Forbes in high regard: even when Prime Minister he would roll up his sleeves and help load sheep from his farm on the railway wagons for market.

Early life
Forbes was born in Lyttelton, just outside the city of Christchurch. He gained his education at Christchurch Boys' High School in Christchurch, and did not attend university. He became known for his ability at sport, particularly in athletics, rowing, and rugby where he captained the Canterbury team. After finishing school he briefly worked in his father's ships' chandlery business in Lyttelton, but later established himself as a successful farmer near Cheviot, to the north of Christchurch. He quickly became active in the local politics of the region, particularly with regard to the Cheviot County Council and the Cheviot Settlers' Association.

Entry to Parliament

He stood as an independent, having failed to gain the Liberal Party nomination. He lost the election. He would hold this seat for thirty-five years.

Forbes remained a backbencher for some time, but became the Liberal Party's Whip when party leader Thomas Mackenzie became Prime Minister in March 1912. He retained this position when his party went into Opposition on 10 July 1912. However, he had considerably higher status within the party than his official responsibilities indicated, although few thought of him as a potential leader.

By the early 1920s, the Liberal Party faced a decision as to its political future. The Reform Party government of William Massey dominated the political scene, having secured the conservative vote, while the growing Labour Party had started to undermine Liberal's progressive voter-base. Many members of the Liberal Party believed an alliance with the Reform Party inevitable, seeing such co-operation as necessary to counteract the "radicalism" of the Labour Party. When Massey died in 1925, Liberal leader Thomas Wilford decided to approach Massey's successor with a merger-proposal, suggesting that the new party could use the name "the National Party". The Liberal Party chose Forbes to represent them at a joint conference. The new Reform Party leader, Gordon Coates, rejected the proposal, although Wilford declared that Liberal would adopt the name "National" regardless.

Party leader

Shortly after the merger proposal was rejected, Wilford resigned as leader, and Forbes unexpectedly became party leader. In the election later that year, however, the party did very badly, gaining only eleven seats compared with Reform's fifty-five. To compound the injury, Forbes no longer even held the post of Leader of the Opposition – the Labour Party had won twelve seats, enabling its leader Harry Holland to claim seniority in Opposition, although with two independents sitting in opposition as well the position of Leader of the Opposition remained vacant until Labour won the 1926 Eden by-election.

The party's poor fortune did not last long, however. In 1927, Liberal Party politician Bill Veitch secured an alliance with Albert Davy, a former Reform Party organiser who had become dissatisfied with what he saw as Reform's paternalism and intrusive governance. The remains of the Liberal Party, still calling itself National, absorbed Davy's new "United New Zealand Political Organization", and adopted the name "the United Party". Forbes and Veitch both vied as candidates for the leadership of the United Party, but the position eventually went to a former Liberal Party Prime Minister, Joseph Ward. Forbes became one of two deputy leaders, having particular responsibility for the South Island.

Under the United banner, bolstered by Reform Party dissidents, the remnants of the old Liberal Party once again gained traction. In the 1928 election, United unexpectedly won as many seats as Reform, and formed a government with backing from the Labour Party. Forbes gained the portfolios of Lands and Agriculture. 

Ward had been in poor health for most of the 1920s, and continued to decline throughout his second tenure as Prime Minister. By the spring of 1930, Ward could no longer carry out his duties, leaving Forbes as acting Prime Minister in all but name. In May 1930, Ward finally gave his official resignation, and Forbes succeeded him as United Party leader and Prime Minister. He also served as his own Minister of Finance.

Prime Minister
As Prime Minister, Forbes, described as "apathetic and fatalistic", reacted to events but showed little vision or purpose. Opponents also criticised him for relying too much on the advice of his friends. However, the depression years proved a difficult time for many governments around the world, and his defenders claim that he did the best job possible in the circumstances of the economic crisis. During his premiership, Forbes also served as the Minister of External Affairs between 1930 and 1935.

The Forbes government began to show signs of instability when the Labour Party withdrew its support. Labour expressed dissatisfaction with a number of the government's economic measures – Forbes intended them to reduce the government deficit and to stimulate the economy, but Labour claimed that they unnecessarily harmed the interests of poorer citizens. Forbes had perforce to continue with reluctant support from the Reform Party, which now feared Labour's growing popularity.

In late 1931, Forbes called for a "grand coalition" of United, Reform, and Labour to resolve the country's economic problems. Forbes told a joint conference that he would not implement the measures he deemed necessary without broad backing. Labour refused to join this coalition, but ex-PM Coates (prompted by the Reform Party's finance spokesperson, William Downie Stewart Jr) eventually agreed.

In the 1931 election, the United-Reform Coalition performed well, winning a combined total of fifty-one seats. Forbes remained Prime Minister, but surrendered the finance role to William Stewart. Slowly, however, many people came to believe that Coates held significantly too much power, and that Forbes showed himself overwilling to give in to Coates' demands. This view became reinforced when Coates and Stewart argued over financial policy – although Forbes was known to prefer Stewart's policy, he publicly sided with Coates, and Stewart resigned.

Coates replaced Stewart as Minister of Finance, and became even more dominant in the coalition. Stewart, noting this, complained that "the Prime Minister is too passive and the Minister of Finance is too active". Both Forbes and Coates, however, increasingly took the blame for the country's ongoing economic problems, and could not avoid public dissatisfaction. In the election of 1935 the Labour Party defeated the coalition government, gaining fifty-five votes to the coalition's nineteen.

In 1935, Forbes was awarded the King George V Silver Jubilee Medal, and in 1937, he was awarded the King George VI Coronation Medal.

Retirement
By 1935 Forbes had become increasingly weary of politics, writing that he agreed with Stewart's description of the profession as "slavery that is miscalled power". Nevertheless, Forbes reluctantly allowed his colleagues to select him as Leader of the Opposition, and from May 1936 led the new National Party (created out of United and Reform) until October 1936 when Adam Hamilton became the party leader. Both party and leader agreed on Forbes's tenure as leader of the new National Party as a temporary measure, as Forbes had indicated his desire to withdraw from the limelight, and younger figures in the party saw his past tenure as a political liability.

Forbes retained his parliamentary seat until 1943, when he retired after 35 years as a Member of Parliament. He declined the offer of the customary knighthood, and four years after his retirement he died at Crystal Brook, his farm near Cheviot.

The national memorial for Forbes, the George Forbes Memorial Library, forms part of Lincoln University near Christchurch.

References

Further reading

Work of Forbes

Works about Forbes

External links

Encyclopaedia of New Zealand 1966 (George William Forbes)

|-

|-

|-

|-

|-

Attorneys-General of New Zealand
Prime Ministers of New Zealand
Local politicians in New Zealand
New Zealand farmers
New Zealand finance ministers
New Zealand foreign ministers
New Zealand Liberal Party MPs
New Zealand National Party MPs
Leaders of political parties in New Zealand
People from Lyttelton, New Zealand
1869 births
1947 deaths
People educated at Christchurch Boys' High School
Leaders of the Opposition (New Zealand)
United Party (New Zealand) MPs
Members of the New Zealand House of Representatives
New Zealand MPs for South Island electorates
New Zealand members of the Privy Council of the United Kingdom